Gabino Diego Solís is a Spanish actor, born on 18 September 1966 in Madrid. He was educated at Runnymede College, in Madrid.

His credits include: ¡Ay Carmela! and Belle Époque.

Awards
Goya Awards
1999 - Nominated - Best Actor for La hora de los valientes
1995 - Nominated - Best Actor for Los peores años de nuestra vida
1993 - Nominated - Best Supporting Actor for (Belle Époque)
1992 - Nominated - Best Actor for El rey pasmado
1991 - Won - Best Supporting Actor for (¡Ay Carmela!)
European Film Awards
1991 - Nominated - Best Supporting Actor for (¡Ay Carmela!)

References

External links

1966 births
Living people
Male actors from Madrid
Spanish male television actors
Spanish male film actors
Spanish people of Cuban descent
Best Supporting Actor Goya Award winners